Charles Okpaleke  (born 14 March 1983) is a Nigerian film producer. His debut film, Living In Bondage: Breaking Free won seven awards at the Africa Magic Viewers’ Choice Awards 2020, including the Best Movie (West Africa) and Best Overall Movie categories. He has also acquired the rights to remake Nollywood classics including Rattle Snake, Nneka the Pretty Serpent and Glamour Girls.

Early life 
Okpaleke was born to Julian Chukwuemeka Okpaleke, an Assistant Inspector General of the Nigerian Police and Florence Ngozi Okpaleke, an attorney. Okpaleke attended Kings College Lagos and the University of Nigeria where he obtained a bachelor’s degree in 2005. He obtained a master's degree in Health Economics and Health Policy from the University of Birmingham in 2007.

Career 
In 2015, Charles Okpaleke acquired the rights to Living in Bondage from Kenneth Nnebue for a remake. In 2018, it was made public that the film will be a sequel instead of a remake and titled Living in Bondage: Breaking Free. Principal photography of Living in Bondage: Breaking Free took place on location in Lagos, Owerri and Durban. As the effects of corona virus pandemic bit harder in Nollywood, Charles Okpaleke introduced drive-in cinemas in Abuja and Lagos, Nigeria. He did this in collaboration with Silverbird Group and Genesis Cinemas. Okpaleke has also acquired the rights to remake three other Nollywood classics, Rattle Snake, Nneka the Pretty Serpent and Glamour Girls through his Play Network Africa company.

References 

Nigerian film directors
People from Onitsha

1983 births
Living people
Nigerian film producers
Alumni of the University of Birmingham
Nigerian businesspeople
Igbo people
University of Nigeria alumni
People from Anambra State
Africa Magic Viewers' Choice Awards winners